Kraken 33 Mk IV was a 4-5 berth ocean racing trimaran designed by Lock Crowther in Australia. It was apparently first built in the 1960s but was advertised in to the 1970s.

See also
List of multihulls
Lock Crowther
Kraken 18
Kraken 25
Kraken 40

References

Trimarans